The 2015 Women's Africa Cup Sevens was a women's rugby sevens tournament for the continental championship of Africa and a qualification tournament for rugby sevens at the 2016 Summer Olympics. The competition was held in Kempton Park, South Africa on 26–27 September 2015. It was the fifth all-continental African Women's Sevens Championship, hosting teams from both Northern and Southern Africa.

South Africa, as the tournament winner, qualified directly for the Olympic Games but their National Olympic Committee decided not to send a team so the runner-up, Kenya, took their place. The next three place-getters, Tunisia, Zimbabwe and Tunisia progressed to the final qualifying competition to play-off for inclusion in the 2016 Games.

Teams

Pool Stage

Pool A
{| class="wikitable" style="text-align: center;"
|-
!width="200"|Teams
!width="40"|Pld
!width="40"|W
!width="40"|D
!width="40"|L
!width="40"|PF
!width="40"|PA
!width="40"|+/−
!width="40"|Pts
|-style="background:#ccffcc"
|align=left| 
|4||4||0||0||189||0||+189||9
|-style="background:#ccffcc"
|align=left| 
|4||3||0||1||89||50||+39||9
|-
|align=left| 
|4||2||0||2||58||75||-17||6
|-
|align=left| 
|4||1||0||3||34||119||−85||3
|-
|align=left| 
|4||0||0||4||10||145||−135||0
|}

 57-0 
 19-5 
 60-0 
 37-0 
 17-7 
 33-0 
 36-0 
 33-12 
 39-0 
 15-10

Pool B

 46-7 
 15-12  
 52-0 
 47-0 
 14-5 
 19 -7 
 43-7 
 40-0 
 33-0 
 32-0

Placement Stage 
Bowl (9th/10th Place)
 5-12 

Plate (5th/8th Place)

Semi-finals
 10-15  (After Extra Time)
 0-43 

7th/8th Place
 28-0 

Plate Final (5th/6th Place)
 0-15 

Cup (1st/4th Place)Semi-finals 34-0 
 0-39 3rd/4th Place 0-33 Final''
 31-5

Final standings

South Africa will not participate in the 2016 Olympics. Previously SASCOC chief executive Tubby Reddy had stated that winning the continental qualifier would not be enough. Kenya, as the second-placed team in the African qualifiers, advance to the Olympics. Madagascar, the fifth-place finisher in qualifying, was named as a replacement.

See also
 2015 Rugby Africa Men's Sevens Championships

References

2015
Rugby sevens at the 2016 Summer Olympics – Women's tournament
2015 in women's rugby union
2015 rugby sevens competitions
International rugby union competitions hosted by South Africa
2015 in South African rugby union
2015 in African rugby union
Rugby sevens competitions in South Africa